The men's heavyweight was a weightlifting event held as part of the Weightlifting at the 1920 Summer Olympics programme. 1920 was the first time weightlifting was divided into weight categories. Heavyweight was the heaviest category, including weightlifters weighing over 82.5 kilograms. A total of six weightlifters from five nations competed in the event, which was held on 31 August 1920.

Results

References

Sources
 
 

Weightlifting at the 1920 Summer Olympics